Tatsu Ishimoda ( Ishimoda Tatsu; 11 May 1924 – 12 February 2022) was a Japanese politician. A member of the Japanese Communist Party, he served in the House of Representatives from 1972 to 1976. He died in Atsugi on 12 February 2022, at the age of 97.

References

1924 births
2022 deaths
20th-century Japanese politicians
Japanese Communist Party politicians
Members of the House of Representatives (Japan)
Members of the House of Representatives from Kanagawa Prefecture
Japanese trade unionists
Chiba University alumni
People from Miyagi Prefecture
People from Ishinomaki